Kirkconnel railway station is a railway station in the town of Kirkconnel, Dumfries and Galloway, Scotland. The station is unstaffed, owned by Network Rail and managed by ScotRail.

History 
It was one of the few stations on the route to avoid the Beeching Axe in the mid-1960s and was the only intermediate station between Kilmarnock and Dumfries for many years.

The railway poet
A plaque at the station commemorates Alexander Anderson, the poet from Kirkconnel, who rose from being a railway worker to become Chief Librarian at the University of Edinburgh. He was a surfaceman or platelayer on the Glasgow and South Western Railway, and generally wrote under the name of Surfaceman.

Services 
On Monday to Saturdays, there are nine trains per day in each direction towards Dumfries (six of these continue to Carlisle) and Glasgow Central running on a mostly two-hourly frequency. However, there can be gaps up to four hours at certain times of the day. On Sundays, there is a very limited service of two trains per day in each direction towards Carlisle and Glasgow.

There was previously one train a day to Newcastle on Monday to Saturdays, however this was stopped in the May 2022 timetable change.

Gallery

References

Sources

External links 
Video and commentary on Alexander Anderson, poet
Video and commentary on Kirkconnel Railway Station

Railway stations in Dumfries and Galloway
Railway stations served by ScotRail
Railway stations in Great Britain opened in 1850
Former Glasgow and South Western Railway stations
1850 establishments in Scotland